The 2014–15 Lafayette Leopards men's basketball team represented Lafayette College during the 2014–15 NCAA Division I men's basketball season. The Leopards, led by 20th year head coach Fran O'Hanlon, played their home games at the Kirby Sports Center and were members of the Patriot League. They finished the season 20–13, 9–9 in Patriot League play to finish in a tie for fourth place. They defeated Boston University, Bucknell, and American to become champions of the Patriot League tournament. They received an automatic bid to the NCAA tournament where they lost in the second round to Villanova.

Roster

Schedule

|-
!colspan=9 style="background:#800000; color:#000000;"| Non-conference regular season

|-
!colspan=9 style="background:#800000; color:#000000;"| Conference regular season

|-
!colspan=9 style="background:#800000; color:#000000;"| Patriot League tournament

|-
!colspan=9 style="background:#800000; color:#000000;"| NCAA tournament

See also
2014–15 Lafayette Leopards women's basketball team

References

Lafayette Leopards men's basketball seasons
Lafayette
Lafayette
Lafayette Leopards men's basketball team
Lafayette Leopards men's basketball team